Sivanthi Adityan  (24 September 1936 – 19 April 2013) was an Indian media baron who ran Tamil newspapers Daily Thanthi and Maalaimalar. Sivanthi started the first evening Tamil Daily Maalai Murasu at Tirunelveli in 1959. He was an educationist, an industrialist and a philanthropist. He was awarded the Padma Shri by the Government of India. 

He was popularly called "Chinna Ayya" as a mark of respect by the people. In 2012 Adithan bought the NDTV Hindu news channel and renamed it as Thanthi TV. He was the President of Indian Olympic Association from 1987 to 1996.

Early life
Dr. Sivanthi Adityan was the second son of S. P. Adithanar  and Govinthammal. His father S. P. Adithanar  was a lawyer, ex-minister and founder of the Tamil daily newspaper Daily Thanthi. He did his schooling at Ramakrishna Higher Secondary School and Besant Theosophical High School and his Bachelors at the Presidency College. He was an active NCC Cadet during his school and college days. He served as the NCC Commander in his college. 

He began his career as an ordinary worker in Dinath Thanthi, despite being the son of S.P.Adithyan , and gradually climbed the ranks to become the editor. Daily Thanthi was printed in 3 cities (Chennai, Madurai, Trichy) when S. P. Adithanar  handed over the mantle to him in 1959. During his era Daily Thanthi was published in 15 cities across the country and became the most read Tamil daily. He was also an avid sportsman and used to work out and train every day.

Philanthropy
He was a philanthropist and funded the renovation of many temples. In the southern districts of Tamil Nadu, there are many sports clubs bearing his name. He also constructed a state-of-the art indoor volleyball stadium in the Adithanar College, Tiruchendur, where the Indian team used to practice. Dr.B.Sivanthi Adityan   renovated the 178 feet 'Rajagopuram' of Arulmigu Kasivishvanathar Temple Tenkasi, whose gopuram got damaged 200 years ago.

Awards and recognition
The Government of India awarded him Padma Shri in the year 2008 in recognition of his distinguished service in the field of Literature and Education. An Olympic Order of Merit for sports and education in 1995, Padma Shri in 2008, and the OCA Merit Award in 2010 at Guangzhou Asian Games all mirrored his impeccable stature in the world of sports. 

Adityan was at the helm of the Indian Olympic Association from 1987 to 1996. This was an eventful phase. He was compelled to fight various forces, legally and diplomatically. He was the first, and till now, the only one from the South, to head the IOA. In 1995, the International Olympic Committee conferred upon him of the Olympic Order of Merit in recognition of outstanding source rendered by him for the development of Sports & Education.

He was awarded a Gold Medal on 19 July 1989 by the International Volleyball Federation in recognition of his valuable contribution for the development of volleyball in India. His services rendered for the development of Sports and Education earned for him the 'Sports and Study Award' of the International Olympic Committee for the year 1987. He is the first Indian to receive such an award. He was the vice-president of the Sports Development Authority of Tamil Nadu.

During his tenure as president of the Indian Olympic Association he played an instrumental role in bringing the South Asian Federation Games to India. He was also instrumental in building the South Asian Federation Games Village in Chennai. He was elected as the president of the Indian Olympic Association. He was also the president of Indian Olympic Association and vice president of the Olympic Council of Asia.

Death
Dr. Sivanthi Adityan died on Friday, 19 April 2013 at 08-15 PM IST in Chennai, India. He is survived by two daughters and a son, Mr. Balasubramanian Adityan.

References

Tamil businesspeople
Businesspeople from Tamil Nadu
1936 births
2013 deaths
Indian television executives
Indian publishers (people)
Recipients of the Padma Shri in literature & education
Indian sports executives and administrators
Thanthi Group
20th-century Indian businesspeople